The following is a list of notable alumni of Groton School.



A
 Dean Acheson, Secretary of State under President Truman, presidential advisor to Lyndon Johnson
Joseph Wright Alsop IV, politician and insurance executive; father to Joseph Alsop V and Stewart Alsop
 Joseph Wright Alsop V, journalist and syndicated newspaper columnist from the 1930s through the 1970s
 Ayi Kwei Armah, Ghanaian novelist, short-story writer, essayist, considered one of Africa's most important writers
 Hugh Auchincloss, acting Director of the National Institute of Allergy and Infectious Diseases
 Hugh D. Auchincloss, stockbroker and lawyer
 James C. Auchincloss, United States Representative from New Jersey
 Louis Auchincloss, author, winner of the National Medal of Arts

B
 Tracy Barnes, CIA officer, one of the planners of the Bay of Pigs Invasion of Cuba
 Francis M. Bator, Deputy National Security Advisor of the United States, Professor, author
 Paul M. Bator, Deputy Solicitor General, legal scholar
 Donald Beer, 1956 Olympic gold medalist in men's eights, rowing
 Francis Biddle, Attorney General under Franklin D. Roosevelt (1941–1945), Chief American Justice of the Nuremberg Trials
 George Biddle, artist
 Hiram Bingham IV, American Vice Consul in Marseilles, France during World War II
 Jonathan Brewster Bingham, United States Representative from New York
 Richard M. Bissell, Jr., CIA Deputy Director for Plans, Bay of Pigs Invasion planner, father of U-2; formed the basis for Matt Damon's character in The Good Shepherd
 McGeorge Bundy, National Security Advisor under Presidents Kennedy and Johnson
 William Bundy, McGeorge Bundy's brother, foreign affairs advisor to Presidents Kennedy and Johnson

C
 Henry Chauncey, founder, Educational Testing Services, Harvard University administrator, father, Sam Chauncey
 Sam Chauncey, Yale University administrator
 Ben Coes, novelist, New York Times bestselling author 
 Hamilton Coolidge, World War I flying ace
 Jim Cooper, United States Representative from Tennessee
 Edwin Corning Jr., member of the New York State Assembly
 Erastus Corning 2nd, mayor of Albany, New York
 Laurence Curtis, United States Representative from Massachusetts
 Bronson M. Cutting, United States Senator from New Mexico

D
 F. Trubee Davison, Director of Personnel for the Central Intelligence Agency
 Charlie Devens, baseball player, New York Yankees 1932-1934
 C. Douglas Dillon, Secretary of the Treasury, Under Secretary of State, Ambassador to France
 Henry Francis du Pont, horticulturist and Founder of the Winterthur Museum housing one of the most important collections of Americana in the United States

E

F
 Adrian S. Fisher, deputy director of the U.S. Arms Control and Disarmament Agency
 Ned Freed, co-author of the MIME email standard (RFCs 2045–2049)

G
 Peter Gammons, Baseball Hall of Fame inductee, baseball writer and commentator
 Alex Gansa, producer for the TV show Homeland, Primetime Emmy Award for Outstanding Drama Series Winner
 Sumner Gerard, Ambassador to Jamaica, businessman
 John B. Goodenough, scientist, awarded the National Medal of Science and Nobel Prize in Chemistry for his work developing the lithium battery
 Ward Goodenough, anthropologist known for his studies in the southern Pacific islands
 Gerrit Graham, actor
 Marshall Green, Ambassador to Indonesia and Australia and Assistant Secretary of State under President Richard Nixon
 Joseph Grew, Ambassador to Japan before WWII, Under Secretary of State
 Charles Grimes, 1956 Olympic gold medalist in men's eights, rowing
 Ashbel Green Gulliver, former dean of Yale Law School
 Gordon Gund, formerly the principal owner of the NBA franchise, Cleveland Cavaliers; co-owner of the NHL franchise, San Jose Sharks
 Fred Gwynne, actor

H
 Pierpont M. Hamilton, United States Army Air Forces Major General, recipient of the Medal of Honor
 E. Roland Harriman, financier and philanthropist
 W. Averell Harriman, Secretary of Commerce, U.S. Ambassador to the Soviet Union, U.S. Ambassador to Britain, Governor of New York
Percy Haughton, was head football coach at Cornell, Columbia and Harvard
 Stuart Heintzelman, United States Army Major General
 Richard Hely-Hutchinson, 8th Earl of Donoughmore, Irish peer
 Stephen A. Higginson, Judge of the Fifth Circuit Court of Appeals
 George Holding, member of Congress

K
 Francis Keppel, Commissioner of Education under President Kennedy
 Howard Kingsbury, 1924 Olympic gold medallist in men's eights, rowing
 Peter Kunhardt, documentary film maker

L
 Christopher Landau, United States Ambassador to Mexico
 James Lawrence, 1928 Olympic gold medallist in men's coxed fours, rowing
 Hunter Lewis, author
 George C. Lodge, professor at Harvard Business School

M
 Lincoln MacVeagh, ambassador and archeologist
 W. Kingsland Macy, congressman
Greg Maffei, CEO of Liberty Media
 Peter Magowan, managing general partner, San Francisco Giants
 Harry Mathews, poet
 Joseph Medill McCormick, United States Senator from Illinois
 Robert R. McCormick, publisher, Chicago Tribune
 Walter Russell Mead, Henry A. Kissinger Chair at the Council on Foreign Relations
 Henry Sturgis Morgan, grandson of JP Morgan
 Newbold Morris, President of the New York City Council under Mayor Fiorello La Guardia
 Daniyal Mueenuddin, Pakistani author
 Henry A. Murray, psychologist at Harvard University, developer of Personology and Thematic Apperception Test (TAT)

N
 Candace Nelson, founder of Sprinkles Cupcakes

O

P
 James Graham Parsons, Ambassador to Laos and Sweden, Deputy U.S. Representative to SALT (Strategic Arms Limitation Talks), 1970–1972
 Alexandra Paul, actress, star of Baywatch
 Endicott Peabody, former Governor of Massachusetts
 Fuller Potter, abstract-expressionist artist
 Norman Prince, aviator

Q

R
 Stanley Rogers Resor, Secretary of the Army, Under Secretary of Defense for Policy
 Archibald Bulloch Roosevelt, son of President Theodore Roosevelt; distinguished U.S. Army officer and commander of U.S. forces in both World War I and II
 Archibald Bulloch Roosevelt, Jr., career CIA officer, soldier, scholar, linguist; grandson of President Theodore Roosevelt
 Franklin Delano Roosevelt, 32nd President of the United States
 Franklin Delano Roosevelt, Jr., son of President Franklin D. Roosevelt; Congressman from New York; Naval Officer
 James Roosevelt, son of President Franklin D. Roosevelt; Congressman from California; Brigadier General in the United States Marine Corps
 James "Tadd" Roosevelt, Jr., Franklin D. Roosevelt's nephew, who was slightly older than his uncle, and attended Groton at the same time
 Kermit Roosevelt, son of President Theodore Roosevelt; successful businessman; service in both World Wars 
 Kermit Roosevelt, Jr., career CIA; organized Operation Ajax; grandson of President Theodore Roosevelt
 Quentin Roosevelt, son of President Theodore Roosevelt; fought and died in World War I
 Quentin Roosevelt II, son of Theodore Roosevelt III; grandson of President Theodore Roosevelt; killed in a plane crash under mysterious circumstances in China in 1948
 Theodore Roosevelt III, son of President Theodore Roosevelt; led the D-day assault on Utah Beach; recipient of the Medal of Honor
 Theodore Roosevelt IV, World War II Veteran; eldest son of Theodore Roosevelt, Jr.; grandson of President Theodore Roosevelt
 Theodore Roosevelt V, managing director at Barclays Capital; prominent conservationist; former U.S. Navy SEAL and U.S. Foreign Service Officer, great-grandson of President Theodore Roosevelt
 Eugene Rostow, Under-Secretary of State under President Johnson, head of Arms Control Agency
 George Rublee, lawyer and diplomat
 Tom Rush, singer-songwriter

S
 Robert C. Scott, United States Representative from Virginia
 Ellery Sedgwick, editor
 Sarah Sewall, Director of the Carr Center for Human Rights Policy
 Frederick Sheffield, 1924 Olympic gold medallist in men's eights, rowing
 Curtis Sittenfeld, author

T
 Ambassador David Thorne, founder of Body And Soul magazine; US Ambassador to Italy, appointed by President Barack Obama
 John Train, investment adviser and author
 Sandy Treadwell, Secretary of State of New York

U

V
 Cyrus Vance, Jr., Manhattan District Attorney
 Andrés Velasco, Finance Minister of Chile
 Nicholas Vreeland, Buddhist monk

W
 George Herbert Walker III, former ambassador to Hungary and board member of the New York Stock Exchange
 Bradford Washburn, photographer, director of the Boston Museum of Science from 1939 to 1980 and Honorary Director (a lifetime appointment) 1985–2007
 Sherwood Washburn, physical anthropologist
 James Waterston, actor, Dead Poets Society
 Sam Waterston, actor, notably Law & Orders Jack McCoy
 J. Watson Webb, Jr., film editor
 Sumner Welles, Under Secretary of State under FDR
 James Boyd White, legal and literary scholar
 Harry Payne Whitney, businessman and Thoroughbred horse breeder
 John Hay Whitney, Ambassador to Britain, newspaper publisher
 Richard Whitney, President of the New York Stock Exchange
 William Payne Whitney, philanthropist and businessman

X

Y

Z

References

Groton School
Groton School